Marla Frazee (born January 16, 1958) is an American author and illustrator of children's literature. She has won two Caldecott Honors for picture book illustration.

Early life and college
Frazee was born in Los Angeles, California and moved to Glendale, California, during her childhood. She is of Lebanese descent. Frazee found her early inspiration in children's books such as Maurice Sendak's Where the Wild Things Are and Robert McCloskey's Blueberries for Sal. She illustrated her first book in third grade, which was called The Friendship Circle. After it won an award in a state fair competition, Frazee created a duplicate for her school library. It was Frazee's first book.

She attended college in the Greater Los Angeles Area, where she earned her bachelor of fine arts at Art Center College of Design and graduated in 1981. While attending school, Frazee met photographer Tim Bradley. The two married in 1982 and raised three sons: Graham, Reed and James. The marriage ended in divorce in 2013.

Career

After college (1981–1990)
After graduating from college, Frazee worked for various companies in advertising, educational publishing, toys, games, and magazines. She did toy design with companies like Mattel, Milton Bradley, and Parker Brothers. Frazee made Happy Meal boxes for McDonald's and team characters for the National Football League.

World-Famous Muriel and the Magic Mystery and That Kookoory! (1990–1995)
In 1990 Frazee illustrated her first published book, World-Famous Muriel and the Magic Mystery, written by Sue Alexander. After Muriel, Frazee illustrated That Kookoory!, written by Margaret Walden Froehlich. She received positive reviews of her work in the Horn Book Magazine, a journal for children's literature and young-adult literature.

The Seven Silly Eaters (1997)
The release of The Seven Silly Eaters, written by Mary Ann Hoberman, marked a turning point in Frazee's career. The book revolves around a family with seven children, each of whom are extremely picky eaters. A review from the Horn Book called it, "A pleasure for parent and child." More positive reviews followed.

On the Morn of Mayfest – Mrs. Biddlebox (1998–2002)
Following the release of The Seven Silly Eaters, Frazee illustrated many books which increased her popularity. In 1998, Frazee illustrated On the Morn of Mayfest written by Erica Silverman. After the publication of On the Morn of Mayfest, Frazee's next book was Hush, Little Baby. Frazee illustrated the classic folk song in 1999. In 2000, Frazee illustrated a book written by Mem Fox. Harriet, You'll Drive Me Wild!, deals with Harriet, a little girl who doesn't mean to be pesky but can't help but get in the way of her mother. They both do things they wish they hadn't, but their love for each other remains strong. Then in 2001, Frazee illustrated Everywhere Babies, a book written by Susan Meyers. The book tells babies all the ways their families love them, and the diverse community Frazee created is united by the love for their children. After Everywhere Babies, Frazee illustrated Linda Smith's text, Mrs. Biddlebox in 2002. Mrs. Biddlebox uses all the ingredients to her bad day (fog, dirt, and sky) to bake a delicious cake.

Roller Coaster (2003)
Frazee wrote her first book, Roller Coaster in 2003. The idea for the book was conceived during a family trip, during which Frazee's sons talked continuously about roller coasters. Roller Coaster became the first book both written and illustrated by Frazee. It follows a typical roller coaster ride and its passengers; a young girl apprehensive about the ride becomes the main character.

Clementine – All the World (2006–2009)
In 2006, Frazee illustrated Clementine, a series of chapter books written by Sara Pennypacker Frazee uses pen and ink drawings to make the story of an overly-active and imaginative third-grader come to life. More recently, Frazee wrote and illustrated A Couple of Boys have the Best Week Ever. Loosely based upon the adventures of her son and his friend at a nature camp, Frazee captures the essence of summer vacation and what it means to children. Frazee earned her first Caldecott Honor for her illustrations in the book, although she wrote it as well. Following the publication of A Couple of Boys have the Best Week Ever, Frazee illustrated All the World, a book written by Elizabeth Garton Scanlon. The book follows a family and their friends through the course of a day and ends with a festive gathering at night. For her beautiful illustrations and double page spreads, Frazee picked up another Caldecott Honor.

The Boss Baby (2007)
In Fall 2007, The Boss Baby, both written and illustrated by Frazee, was published. Frazee describes a young couple's newest arrival. The baby quickly takes over their lives with his nightly "meetings" and demands. The Boss Baby was met with positive reviews, with the Horn Book Magazine calling it "this year's baby-shower hit." In all, The Boss Baby garnered more than three starred reviews. DreamWorks Animation released an animated feature film loosely based on the book in March 2017, with a sequel released in July 2021. DreamWorks also released a Netflix show based on the book titled The Boss Baby: Back in Business.

Awards
 Caldecott Honors for A Couple of Boys Have the Best Week Ever and All the World
 Charlotte Zolotow Award in 2019 for Little Bear 
 School Library Journal's Best Book of 2001
 Horn Book Fanfare
 Parenting Magazine Reading Magic Award
 Society of Children's Book Writer's and Illustrator's Golden Kite Award
 Children's Literature Council of Southern California's Excellence in Illustration Award

Works

As illustrator
 World Famous Muriel and the Magic Mystery
 That Kookoory!
 The Seven Silly Eaters
 On the Morn of Mayfest
 Harriet, You'll Drive Me Wild!
 Everywhere Babies
 Mrs. Biddlebox
 New Baby Train
 Clementine Series
 Clementine
 The Talented Clementine
 Clementine's Letter
 All the World
 Stars
 Hush Little Baby: A Folk Song with Pictures
 The People in Pineapple Place – cover
Aurora county all stars
Boss baby

As writer and illustrator
 Roller Coaster
 Santa Claus, The World's Number One Toy Expert
 Walk On, A Guide for Babies of All Ages
 A Couple of Boys Have the Best Week Ever
 The Boss Baby (book)
 The Bossier Baby
 The Farmer and the Clown
 Boot and Shoe

References

External links
 
 

1958 births
American children's book illustrators
American children's writers
American women illustrators
Living people
Writers from Los Angeles
American women children's writers
Artists from Los Angeles
People from Glendale, California
Art Center College of Design alumni
20th-century American writers
20th-century American artists
20th-century American women writers
20th-century American women artists
21st-century American writers
21st-century American artists
21st-century American women writers
21st-century American women artists
American people of Lebanese descent